John David Maguire (August 7, 1932 – October 26, 2018) was an American academic administrator and civil rights activist. He was the president of SUNY Old Westbury and Claremont Graduate University, and was known for his early promotion of diversity in American higher education.

References

1932 births
2018 deaths
American activists
State University of New York at Old Westbury
Claremont Graduate University faculty
Heads of universities and colleges in the United States